Ryan Glennon McKenna (born April 27, 1973) is an American politician who served as a Democratic member of the Missouri Senate, representing the 22nd District from 2007 to 2014. He was a previously member of the Missouri House of Representatives from 1999 through 2006.

McKenna has lived in Jefferson County, Missouri his entire life. He graduated from St. Pius X High School in the Twin City area and went on to attend Jefferson College, playing on their State Championship baseball team in 1993. He graduated from Missouri State University (formerly Southwest Missouri State University) in 1996, where he received a Bachelor of Science degree in Education.

McKenna's father is William McKenna, who served as a member of both chambers of the Missouri General Assembly.

External links
Missouri Senate - Senator Ryan McKenna official government website
 
Follow the Money - Ryan Glennon McKenna
2008 2006 Missouri Senate campaign contributions
2002 2000 1998 Missouri House campaign contributions

Democratic Party Missouri state senators
Democratic Party members of the Missouri House of Representatives
People from Jefferson County, Missouri
1973 births
Living people